Leucopogon flavescens is a species of flowering plant in the heath family Ericaceae and is endemic to the south-west of Western Australia. It is a shrub with oblong leaves and white, tube-shaped flowers that are densely bearded on the inside.

Description
The flowers are arranged singly in leaf axils with bracteoles but no bracts at the base.

Taxonomy and naming
Leucopogon flavescens was first formally described in 1845 by Otto Wilhelm Sonder in Johann Georg Christian Lehmann's Plantae Preissianae. The specific epithet (flavescens) means "yellowish", referring to the leaves when dried.

In 1868, George Bentham described two varieties of L. flavescens in Flora Australiensis, and the names are accepted by the Australian Plant Census:
 Leucopogon flavescens var. brevifolius Benth.;
 Leucopogon flavescens Benth. var. flavescens Hislop.

Distribution
This leucopogon occurs in the Avon Wheatbelt, Esperance Plains and Jarrah Forest bioregions in the south-west of Western Australia.

Conservation status
Leucopogon flavescens is listed as "not threatened" by the Government of Western Australia Department of Biodiversity, Conservation and Attractions.

References

flavescens
Ericales of Australia
Flora of Western Australia
Plants described in 1845
Taxa named by Otto Wilhelm Sonder